Introducing... Mari Hamada is the first international release by Japanese singer/songwriter Mari Hamada, released on May 30, 1993, in Asia and January 24, 1994, in Europe by MCA Records. The album was co-produced by Marc Tanner, best known for producing Nelson's debut album After the Rain. Some of the English songs are reworked versions of Hamada's hit singles from previous Japanese releases. Both releases differ wherein the Asian release contains English and Japanese songs, while the European release is all-English. The additional English songs on the European version were compiled in a second Asian release titled All My Heart on August 4, 1994.

In Japan, selected songs from this album were released in Hamada's 1993 CD Anti-Heroine and the 2003 compilation Inclination II.

To promote the album, music videos were made for the songs "Hold On (One More Time)" and "I Have a Story to Tell".

Track listing
Asia Release (MCD30909)

Tracks 1–8 in English. Tracks 9–13 in Japanese.
Tracks 1, 3, 6, 9–11 available in the 1993 album Anti-Heroine.
Tracks 12–13 originally from the 1991 album Tomorrow.

Europe Release (MCD11039)

Tracks 1, 3, 9, 11 available in the 1994 international album All My Heart.

Personnel 
 Michael Landau – guitar
 Leland Sklar – bass
 John Pierce – bass
 Paul Mirkovich – keyboards
 Kim Bullard – keyboards
 Mike Baird – drums
 Tommy Girvin – electric sitar
 Donna Delory – backing vocals

References

External links 
  (Asia release)
  (Europe release)
 
 

1993 compilation albums
Mari Hamada compilation albums
MCA Records compilation albums
English-language Japanese albums